Witoszyn may refer to the following places:
Witoszyn, Lublin Voivodeship (east Poland)
Witoszyn, Lubusz Voivodeship (west Poland)
Witoszyn, West Pomeranian Voivodeship (north-west Poland)